Squaloraja polyspondyla is an extinct chimaeriform fish from the Lower Jurassic of Europe first found by Mary Anning in 1829.  Fossils of S. polyspondyla have been found in Lower Jurassic-aged marine strata of Lyme Regis, England, and Osteno, Italy.

Individuals of S. polyspondyla are characterized by their flattened, ray-like bodies, enormous, flattened rostra that comprise half of the bodylength, and, in males, a long, horn-like process.

See also
 List of prehistoric cartilaginous fish

References

Chimaeriformes
Prehistoric cartilaginous fish genera
Jurassic cartilaginous fish
Jurassic fish of Europe